No Frills Love is a 1985 dance single by Broadway star and Tony Award winner, Jennifer Holliday.  The single was first a hit when it became Holliday's fourth Hot 100 entry.  "No Frills Love" peaked at number eighty-seven on the pop chart, and at number twenty-nine on the soul singles chart.  Early in 1986, the single made it to number one on the dance charts, for one week.  A decade later a new mix of No Frills Love hit the top spot on the dance charts, for one week.

References

1985 singles
1996 singles
1985 songs
Disco songs
Electronic songs
Songs written by Arthur Baker (musician)